The Alberta Pacific Grain Company Limited began in 1900 as the Alberta Grain Company, founded by Nicholas Bawlf and associates. In 1911 Alberta Grain Co. was merged with the Alberta Pacific Company Limited to form the Alberta Pacific Grain Company Limited. In 1967, the company was taken over by Federal Grain.

Remaining elevators
Historic (protected);

 Castor and District Museum, local museum with a 1910 Alberta Pacific elevator.
 Meeting Creek, Alberta, 1914 Alberta Pacific elevator open to public for tours.
 St. Albert Grain Elevator Park, a museum consisting of two elevators an original 1906 Alberta Grain Co. and 1929 Alberta Wheat Pool elevator.
 Val Marie, Saskatchewan, 1924 Alberta Pacific elevator.

Historic (Private-museum);
 Alberta Central Railway Museum, a railway museum with an historic 1906 Alberta Grain Co. elevator moved from Hobbema. The elevator is known to be Alberta's second-oldest grain elevator.
 Raley, Alberta, oldest grain elevator in Alberta a 1904-1905 Alberta Pacific.
 Dorothy, Alberta, 1928, Alberta Pacific elevator in poor condition.
 Lousana, Alberta, 1919, Alberta Pacific in poor condition, moved to a private farm east of Lousana in 1973.

See also
 List of Canadian Heritage Wheat Varieties

References

External links
The Remaining Alberta Pacific Grain Elevators
Feed Storage Bins and Steel Grain Bins

Companies based in Alberta
Agriculture companies of Canada
Grain companies
Food and drink companies established in 1900
Defunct companies of Alberta
Grain elevators in Alberta
1900 establishments in the Northwest Territories
Food and drink companies disestablished in 1967
1967 disestablishments in Alberta